Pashtun Garhi

Pashtun Garhi is a town and union council of Nowshera District in Khyber Pakhtunkhwa province of Pakistan. It is located on the bank of the Kabul River at 34°2'44N 71°50'9E and has an altitude of 258 metres (849 feet). 
It was a village among the few villages owned by Malik Mohibullah Khan who was the khan of those villages,Mohib banda is named on his name,Dagi,Tolandi are the few villages he owned (circa 1750) .

This village was damaged by floods in 2010 and is now re built by the khans of Dheri Zardad

Dheri Zardad is the last point in Chasadda district.

References

Union councils of Charsadda District
Populated places in Charsadda District, Pakistan